Vivian Sakiyyah Green (born May 22, 1979) is an American R&B singer-songwriter and pianist.

Early life 
Green was born May 22, 1979 in the East Oak Lane neighborhood of Philadelphia, and took an interest in singing, playing the piano, and songwriting at a very young age. At the age of thirteen, she became a member of a female quintet called Younique. She is a graduate of what is now Parkway Northwest High School for Peace and Social Justice.

Green has credit for writing "Dear God" by Boyz II Men, from their 1997 album Evolution. Green received her big break at the age of nineteen when she became a backup singer for Jill Scott, who took her on an international tour. She signed to Columbia Records in late 2000.

Career

2001–2003: A Love Story 
In 2002, Green released her debut album, A Love Story, which featured the number-one single "Emotional Rollercoaster". In the meantime, Green made a cameo appearance in the Cole Porter biopic De-Lovely singing a cover version of Porter's 1930 song "Love for Sale", which made the film's soundtrack album. She also played Brenda Holloway in an episode of the first season of NBC's drama series American Dreams, entitled "The Carpetbaggers" (originally aired on April 6, 2003), performing a rendition of Holloway's 1964 hit "Every Little Bit Hurts".

2004–2006: Vivian 
In 2005, she appeared on Cyndi Lauper's The Body Acoustic album on the tracks "I'll Be Your River" and "Sisters of Avalon".

During the spring of 2005, three years after the release of her debut album, Green released her second studio album Vivian. It featured the lead single "Gotta Go Gotta Leave (Tired)", which peaked at No. 24 on the R&B chart and No. 1 on the dance charts The song also charted No. 1 on the Hot Adult Airplay. The track known as "I Like It (But I Don't Need It)" followed up as the album's second single. The song followed up the previous single's success by also reaching #1 on the dance charts.

2007–2011: Beautiful 
In 2007, Green appeared on Guru's album Jazzmatazz, Vol. 4: The Hip-Hop Jazz Messenger: Back to the Future on the track "Fine and Free". While performing at a gig in support of her second album, Green announced that she is currently recording her third full-length album on Koch Records. In April 2009, she signed a 3-album deal with E1 Music with the first album under the deal set to be released in Summer 2009. Her third album titled Beautiful was released April 6, 2010. The songs explore the ins and outs of love from a variety of perspectives, from the youthful romanticism of "Somewhere" to the playful insight of "So Good" and "Better Man" to the hard-won intensity of "Masterpiece" and "Beautiful."

In contrast to her first two albums, which were recorded in a variety of studios with multiple producers, Vivian approached the recording of Beautiful in a more intimate, organic manner.  With the exception of "Save Me," which she cut with Jason Farmer (Keyshia Cole, Wyclef Jean, Rihanna) in the producer's seat, Vivian recorded the entire album with Grammy-nominated producer Anthony Bell, a longtime friend and collaborator who made key production contributions to her first two albums, and whose extensive resume also includes work with Jazmine Sullivan, Jewel, Musiq, Raheem DeVaughn and Jill Scott.

In 2011, she collaborated with Phoe Notes for a winter single titled "Missing You". It was released digitally on December 9. Phoe Notes and Green shot a video for the track on December 16. Additionally, she recorded the track "Keep On Going" for the Good Times – London and "Let It Burn" for the Birds Eye Riddim compilations.

2012–2013: The Green Room 
In 2012, her single, "Oh Freedom" for the Soundtrack for a Revolution was released on January 3, 2012. Later in the year, she did a couple of collaborations which included "Love" (w/Zion) for the album Legacy, "La La Means I Love You" (w/Bob Baldwin) for the album Betcha By Golly Wow: The Songs Of Thom Bell, and "Still Here" (w/Brian Culbertson) for the album Dreams.

On August 7, 2012, Green released "Anything Out There" the lead single from her fourth album The Green Room. The album was released on October 9, 2012.

In 2013, she undertook a few festivals and concerts in addition to TV appearances on BET and Centric's music series.

2014–2016:  Vivid 
In 2014, Green became the first artist signed to rapper/producer Kwamé's record label, Make Noise Recordings. Vivid, her fifth studio album was distributed via Caroline Records. On April 7, 2015, the first single released from the album was "Get Right Back to My Baby". The song went to No. 2 on Billboard's UAC chart. In 2015, Green was nominated for a Soul Train Award. In 2016, she released "Grown Folks Music (Work)", which went to the top 15 on Billboard's UAC chart.

2017–2019: VGVI 
On July 7, 2017, Green released the first single off her sixth album VGVI, titled "I Don't Know". The song became a top-10 hit on Billboard's Adult R&B chart. VGVI was released on October 6, 2017.

2020–Present: Love Absolute 
In October 2019, Green and Kwamé signed with the SoNo Recording Group through Kwamé's record label, Make Noise Recordings. Her seventh studio album, Love Absolute, was released on November 13, 2020.

Personal life 
Between her first and second albums, she took a three-year hiatus. In 2004, she gave birth to her son Jordan. Green became an advocate for special needs children, publicly speaking about her experiences.

Discography 

Studio albums
 A Love Story (2002)
 Vivian (2005)
 Beautiful (2010)
 The Green Room (2012)
 Vivid (2015)
 VGVI (2017)
 Love Absolute (2020)

Award history 
BET Awards
2003: Best R&B Female Artist (nominated)

Lady of the Soul Train Awards
2003: Best Solo R&B/Soul Single "Emotional Rollercoaster" (nominated)
2003: Best Solo R&B/Soul Album of the Year A Love Story (nominated)
2003: Best Solo R&B/Soul or Rap New Artist: Vivian Green (nominated)

Soul Train Awards
2015: Centric Certified Award (nominated)

References

External links 
Official website

African-American women singer-songwriters
African-American pianists
American women pianists
American rhythm and blues singer-songwriters
Columbia Records artists
Living people
American neo soul singers
Musicians from Philadelphia
Rhythm and blues pianists
1979 births
Singer-songwriters from Pennsylvania
American contemporary R&B singers
Ballad musicians
21st-century American pianists
21st-century African-American women singers